The Key 65 is an Indian reserve of The Key First Nation in Saskatchewan, Canada. It is 26 kilometres northwest of Kamsack. In the 2016 Canadian Census, it recorded a population of 143 living in 46 of its 58 total private dwellings. In the same year, its Community Well-Being index was calculated at 60 of 100, compared to 58.4 for the average First Nations community and 77.5 for the average non-Indigenous community.

References

Indian reserves in Saskatchewan
Division No. 9, Saskatchewan
The Key First Nation